Shaban Nditi (born 5 March 1983) is a Tanzanian football midfielder who plays club football for Mtibwa Sugar FC and international football for Tanzania.

References

1983 births
Living people
Tanzanian footballers
Tanzania international footballers
Simba S.C. players
Mtibwa Sugar F.C. players
Association football midfielders
Tanzanian Premier League players
2009 African Nations Championship players
Tanzania A' international footballers